Genadio of Astorga, San Genadio or popularly San Juanacio (c. 865, possibly El Bierzo, León - 936, Peñalba de Santiago) was a Spanish Benedictine monk, hermit and bishop of Astorga between 899 and 920. He also founded several monasteries in El Bierzo. He made the Caves of San Genadio and retired there with other priests in periods of penance.

References

External links
http://dialnet.unirioja.es/servlet/articulo?codigo=2379755

9th-century Christian monks
10th-century bishops
Benedictine monks
Spanish bishops
Spanish saints
Bishops of Astorga
860s births
Year of birth uncertain
936 deaths